Linda Papadopoulos (born May 10, 1971) is a Canadian psychologist based in England.

Education
Papadopoulos was born in Toronto, Ontario, Canada, on May 10, 1971. She earned a BA degree in Psychology from York University in Toronto, Ontario, Canada, an MSc in Health psychology from the University of Surrey in the United Kingdom and a PhD in Psychology from City University in London.

Career
In 2010, she was commissioned by the Home Office to write a review on the effects of sexualisation on young people.

Papadopoulos appeared as the resident psychotherapist for 3 seasons of VH1’s reality show Celebrity Fit Club. She also hosted the Discovery Fit & Health channel TV series My Naked Secret, which told the personal stories of people who are hiding physical abnormalities. She has been a regular commentator on many true life crime and history programs on UKTV channels.

References

External links 

1971 births
Living people
Alumni of the University of Surrey
Alumni of City, University of London
Canadian emigrants to England
Canadian women psychologists